Yenişehir Airport  is an international airport in the city of Yenişehir in the Bursa Province of Turkey.

Airlines and destinations
The following airlines operate regular scheduled and charter flights at Burşa Yenişehir  Airport:

Statistics

References

External links

Bursa Travel Guide
Bursa Landing and Taking Off Flights

Transport in Bursa
Airports in Turkey
Yenişehir, Bursa